Tian Tao (born 8 April 1994) is a Chinese weightlifter, Olympian, World Champion, Asian Champion and Asian Games Champion competing in the 85 kg division until 2018 and 96 kg starting in 2018 after the International Weightlifting Federation reorganized the categories.

Career
Tao took up weightlifting in Changyang at ten years of age. He first rose to national prominence after winning the 77 kg category of the Chinese Intercity Games in October 2011 at the age of 17. Although not recognized for not being an international event, his lifts far exceeded the official Youth World Records (by 6/23/35 kg respectively), the jerk of 205 kg even beating the Junior World Record by 3 kg.

Tian's next competition was the April 2012 National Championships where he attempted to qualify for the London Olympic Games. With his total of 365 kg he was however beaten by Lu Haojie and Lu Xiaojun to third place and didn't make the national team. During his second attempt in the jerk with 211 kg he also injured his right elbow and had to rehab for the rest of the year.

In 2013, he moved up to the 85 kg class and competed in January at the Australian Youth Olympic Festival, winning the bronze medal. In the March National Championships he won the snatch with 165 kg but had to retire early again due to injury after only one successful jerk, not placing on the overall podium. Later this year in September at the domestically prestigious Chinese National Games he placed third with only two good attempts. He was nevertheless chosen to represent China at the 2013 World Championships, where he was forced to drop out after the snatch part of the competition.

Major results

References

External links

 
 
 
 

Living people
1994 births
People from Yichang
Weightlifters from Hubei
Chinese male weightlifters
Olympic weightlifters of China
Olympic medalists in weightlifting
2016 Olympic silver medalists for China
Asian Games medalists in weightlifting
Weightlifters at the 2014 Asian Games
Weightlifters at the 2016 Summer Olympics
Asian Games gold medalists for China
Medalists at the 2014 Asian Games
World Weightlifting Championships medalists
21st-century Chinese people